Sean Tretheway (born 11 July 1977) is a paralympic swimmer from New Zealand competing mainly in category S9 events.

Sean competed as part of the New Zealand team at the 2000 Summer Paralympics in Sydney where he finished second behind Britain's James Crisp who set a new world record.  He also raced in the 100m and 400m freestyle but failed to make the final of either.

References

External links 
 
 

1977 births
Living people
New Zealand male freestyle swimmers
Paralympic swimmers of New Zealand
Paralympic silver medalists for New Zealand
Paralympic medalists in swimming
Swimmers at the 2000 Summer Paralympics
Medalists at the 2000 Summer Paralympics
Commonwealth Games medallists in swimming
Commonwealth Games bronze medallists for New Zealand
Swimmers at the 1994 Commonwealth Games
S9-classified Paralympic swimmers
Medallists at the 1994 Commonwealth Games